Western dress codes are a set of dress codes detailing what clothes are worn for what occasion. Conversely, since most cultures have intuitively applied some level equivalent to the more formal Western dress code traditions, these dress codes are simply a versatile framework, open to amalgamation of international and local customs. This versatility has made this scale of formality a practical international formality scale.

Classifications are divided into formal wear (full dress), semi-formal wear (half dress), and informal wear (undress). Anything below this level is referred to as casual wear, although sometimes in combinations such as "smart casual" or "business casual" in order to indicate higher expectation than none at all.

Etiquette

For both men and women, hats corresponding to the various levels of formality exist. As supplements to the standard dress codes headgear (see biretta, kippah etc.) can be worn. Ceremonial dress, military uniform, religious clothing, academic dress, and folk costume appropriate to the formality level are encouraged.

Formal wear

Typical events: Weddings, state dinners and affairs, formal balls, royal events, etc.

Semi-formal wear

Typical events: Theatre opening nights, charity balls, etc.
There is some variation in style depending on whether it is summer or winter. See black tie and stroller for more details.

Informal wear

Typical events: Diplomatic and business meetings, many social occasions, everyday wear

Casual wear

Casual wear encompasses business casual, smart casual, etc.

History

The background of traditional contemporary Western dress codes as fixed in 20th century relied on several steps of replacement of preexisting formal wear, while in turn increasing the formality levels of the previously less formal alternatives. Thus was the case with the ceasing of the justacorps, extensively worn from the 1660s until the 1790s, followed by the same fate of the 18th century frock (not to be confused with frock coat), in turn followed by the frock coat.

Full dress, half dress, and undress

Formal, semi-formal, and informal all have roots in 19th century customs subsequent to the replacement of the 18th century generic justaucorps, and has remained fixed defined since the 20th century. The 19th century frock coat rarely occurs except as formal alternative. For women, interpretations have fluctuated more dynamically according to fashion. 

Before the modern system of formal, semi-formal, and informal was consolidated in the 20th century, the terms were looser. In the 19th century, during the Victorian and Edwardian periods, the principal classifications of clothing were full dress and undress, and, less commonly the intermediate half dress. Full dress covered the most formal option: frock coat for day wear, and dress coat (white tie) for evening wear (sometimes with supplementary alternative being a full dress uniform independent of what time of the day). As such, full dress may still appear in use designating formal wear.

When morning dress became common (in the modern sense, using a morning tailcoat rather than a frock coat), it was considered less formal than a frock coat, and even when the frock coat was increasingly phased out, morning dress never achieved full dress status. Therefore, in the 21st century, full dress often refers to white tie only.

Today's semi-formal evening black tie (originally dinner clothes) was initially described as informal wear, while the "lounge suit," now standard business wear, was originally considered (as its name suggests) casual wear. Half dress, when used, was variously applied at different times, but was used to cover modern morning dress (the term morning dress is fairly undescriptive and has not always meant modern morning dress). Undress (not to be confused with naked) in turn was similarly loose in meaning, corresponding to anything from a dressing gown to a lounge suit or its evening equivalent of dinner clothes (now one of the more formal dress codes seen in many Western regions).

References

Further reading

Formal wear
Western culture